Rose Valley Lake is a reservoir that covers  in Gamble Township, Lycoming County, Pennsylvania, in the United States. The fish and waters of the lake are managed by the Pennsylvania Fish and Boat Commission.

The three-hundred-and-sixty-acre artificial lake is owned by the Commonwealth of Pennsylvania, and was given its name, "Rose Valley Lake," in May 1973 by the Pennsylvania Fish Commission, following approval by the commonwealth's Geographic Names Committee.

History
Created by the Pennsylvania Fish Commission, via the construction of a twenty-five-foot-high, four-hundred-and-ten-foot-long earthen dam on Mill Creek in Lycoming County, Pennsylvania, Rose Valley Lake is a three-hundred-and-sixty-acre artificial body of water that is situated on six hundred and twenty-six acres of land that were originally purchased by the commission for $219,575, using Project 70 funding. In addition to creation of the new lake, the commission also built three boat-launching areas with comfort stations and parking lots. The commission officially dedicated the lake on Sunday, June 24, 1970.

Features
The primary use of Rose Valley Lake is recreational game fishing. The lake is open for recreational fishing on a year-round basis. Ice fishing is permitted, but the thickness of the ice is not monitored by the Fish Commission. 

The most common game species of fish in the lake are, largemouth bass, bluegill, black crappie, muskellunge, yellow perch, chain pickerel, pumpkinseed and walleye. The lake is five miles east of U.S. Route 15 and Pennsylvania Route 14.

Rose Valley Lake may be reached by taking Trout Run Mountain Road to Rose Valley Road.

See also
Rose Valley, in Delaware County, Pennsylvania

References

Reservoirs in Pennsylvania
Protected areas of Lycoming County, Pennsylvania
Bodies of water of Lycoming County, Pennsylvania